Karwan is one of the major suburb in Hyderabad, Telangana, India. It is a part of the old city of Hyderabad.

It is 10 km from the IT hubs like Gachibowli, HITECH City, etc. It had major importance in the trade which happened during the time of Qutub Shahis. Karwan is one of the Vidhan Sabha constituency comes under GHMC Khairtabad zone, circle number 13 which has 6 wards i.e. Ziaguda (62), Karwan (65), Langer House (66), Golconda (67), Tolichowki (68) and Nanalnagar (69).

Culture

Karwan has a mixed population of both Hindus and Muslims. Various religious festival are celebrated across this region. Like Bonalu, Ramazan Eid, Eid-Ul-Adha, Ganesh Chaturthi, Makar Sankranti, Holi, Diwali etc., The festival of Bonalu is one of the famous here and is celebrated in grandeur. The main worship during Bonalu happens at the Darbar Maisamma temple. The celebrations start a week before and on a penultimate day, the thotella is installed in front of Maisamma temple. On the last day many cultural programs take place, along with the distribution of prizes to the meritorious students from UG to PG. The festival culminates with numerous palaharam carts which display various traditions and the removal of thotella along with the procession.

Karwan has very long history dating back to the Nizam rule, it was a well known diamond pearls market, even till today there are old buildings and other old temples and masjids constructed during Nizam period.

Andaroon or Inside karwan has few old buildings and was the place of the old pearl and diamond market existed.  It is also famous for handloom clothes.

Shree Vithalnathji Temple & shree Santhoshi matha temple along with Lord Narsimha swamy temple and Kesari Hanuman temple at (Jiyaguda) are very famous and old temples which are well known in the area.

There is also an old temple named Ranganathswamy temple which was also expected to be built during Nizam period. It is a famous temple in twin cities and famous for Vaikunta Ekadashi celebrations in Jiyaguda. In earlier days it was known as Jiyargudem, which is under Karwan constituency.

KARWAN-I SAHUAN

This was the commercial hub during the Qutb Shahi era. 1500s to late 1600s. Many businessmen, especially moneylenders (Sahu) inhabited the area. A number of shops and storage were located here as well as inns for travelers.

ADDITIONAL READING:

Jean Baptiste Tavernier, Travels  in India, translated by Valentine Ball, Oxford: Oxford University Press, 1925).

Omar Khalid 
A Guide to Architecture in Hyderabad
MIT

Neighborhoods
Jiyaguda
Purana Pool
Begum Bazar
Attapur

Professional services

Internet Marketing Consultant - Bharath Bhushan 
Mee Seva
Jyothi Communications
SK Ambulance Services

Commercial area

The Mehdipatnam Rythu Bazaar and Gudimalkapur vegetable market are close to Karwan. There are many convention centres and big function halls on Karwan road, including:
The Vintage Palace
Crown Function Hall
Mahaboob Pride Palace
KS Palace
SBA Garden - Jiyaguda Road
Grand Garden Hall
SDA Palace

Theaters

S V C Eeshwar (Near pillar no. 130)
Asian Cinemas M Cube (Near pillar no. 114)
Cinepolis
Alankar Cinemas - Langar House
Amba Theatre (Near Mehdipatnam Depot)

Schools
There are schools which cater to all budgets, such as: 
Shuja Grammar School
Bharathi High School,
Vivekananda High School, 
St. Mary's High School, 
Narayana E-Techno School,
D'Drop High School. 
MESCO College in Mustaidpura, 
Sri Gayatri e-Techno School,
Newgen School of Excellence
Kakatiya Vidyaniketan School
Sri Saraswathi Shishu Mandir High School

There are also government-run schools such as Govt. High School Mustaidpura, Govt. High School Kulsumpura, and Bharath Abyudaya High School, the last of which is one of the biggest government schools in Telangana.

Banks
There are many banks in the area, including:
Union Bank (Also known as Andhra Bank)
Bank of Baroda
State Bank of India (Gudimalkapur Branch)
State Bank of India (Karwan Branch)

Transport
There are many buses that connect to different parts of the city like CBS, Golconda, Secunderabad by TSRTC. This area is close to Mehdipatnam Bus Depot. The Karwan/Jiyaguda Bus Stand, near Kesari Hanuman Temple, serves routes (2J/86J/1J/72J/80S) to as far as Secunderabad and L.B.Nagar passing through Afzalgunj.

There is another station in an area called Tallagadda, with buses to Secunderabad (49T, 5K, 16/5K/T) and Ramnagar (6T)

There is no close MMTS Train station near Karwan, but Nampally Railway Station is very near to the Karwan (approximately 5 km).

References

Neighbourhoods in Hyderabad, India
Greater Hyderabad Municipal Corporation